Ålesund is a town in Møre og Romsdal county, Norway.  The town is the administrative centre of Ålesund Municipality.  The centre of the town of Ålesund lies on the islands of Hessa, Aspøya, Nørvøya with newer developments located on the islands of Uksenøya the outer parts of the "urban area" even stretch onto the island of Sula which is in the neighboring Sula Municipality. The town is the main headquarters for the Norwegian Coastal Administration as well as the location of the Sunnmøre District Court.

The town has become more of an urban agglomeration during the late part of the 20th century and the urban area has spread out and into the neighboring municipality. About  of the town with a population of 44,070 lies in Ålesund Municipality and the remaining  of the town with a population of 8,556 lies in Sula Municipality.

The town has an unusually consistent architecture, most of the buildings having been built between 1904 and 1907. Jugendstilsenteret is a national interpretation centre, visitors can learn more about the town fire, the rebuilding of the town and the Art Nouveau style. Ålesund is a partner in the Art nouveau network, a European network of co-operation created in 1999 for the study, safeguards and development of the Art nouveau.

The term "Little London" was often applied to the community during the occupation of Norway by Nazi Germany due to the Norwegian resistance work that took place here. Among other things, the city was central to the flights to Scotland and England.

History

Legend has it that Gangerolf (outside of Norway better known as Rollo), the 10th-century founder of the dynasty of the dukes of Normandy, hailed from the community of Giske, north-west of the present-day town of Ålesund. At least three statues of Rolle exist: in the town park in Ålesund, in the city of Rouen, France, and in Fargo, North Dakota, United States.

The old prestegjeld of Borgund included all of what is now Ålesund.  In 1793, the port of Aalesund was granted limited ladested rights.  Later, in 1824, it was granted full ladested rights. In 1835, Ålesund had 482 inhabitants. On 1 January 1838, the new formannskapsdistrikt law went into effect, granting limited local self-government to all parishes in Norway.  Therefore, on that date, the small ladested of Aalesund became a small municipality with its own council.  It was surrounded by the large rural municipality of Borgund. In 1848, it was upgraded to the status of a kjøpstad, a more important market town.

On 1 January 1875, part of Borgund Municipality (population: 902) was transferred to the town of Ålesund. By 1900, the population had increased to 11,777.

In the night of 23 January 1904, the town was the scene of the Ålesund Fire, one of the most terrible of the many conflagrations to which Norwegian towns, once built largely of wood, have been subjected. Practically the entire town was destroyed during the night, a gale aiding the flames, and the population had to leave the town in the middle of the night with only a few minutes' notice. Only one person died in the fire, the 76-year-old Ane Heen, but more than 10,000 people were left without shelter.

Kaiser Wilhelm of Germany had often been on vacation to Sunnmøre. After the fire, he sent four warships with materials to build temporary shelters and barracks. After a period of planning, the town was rebuilt in stone, brick, and mortar in Jugendstil (Art Nouveau), the architectural style of the time. The structures were designed by approximately 20 master builders and 30 Norwegian architects, most of them educated in Trondheim and Charlottenburg, Berlin, drawing inspiration from all over Europe. To honor Wilhelm, one of the most frequented streets of the town is named after him.

In 1922, another part of Borgund Municipality (population: 1,148) was transferred to the town of Ålesund. During the 1960s, there were many municipal mergers across Norway due to the work of the Schei Committee. On 1 January 1968, most of the neighbouring municipality of Borgund (population: 20,132) was merged with Ålesund forming the new Ålesund Municipality.  This merger more than doubled the population of Ålesund, for a new total population of 38,589 and the land area of the municipality was vastly larger. The town of Ålesund was the administrative centre of the large municipality. After the merger, the town no longer had its own council and was no longer self-governing, with the new municipal council representing the whole municipality.  On 1 January 1977, the island of Sula and some small surrounding islets (population: 6,302) were separated from Ålesund to form the new Sula Municipality. The southern part of the town of Ålesund was located on Sula, therefore the town's urban area overlaps two municipalities.

Name
A part of the town was historically known as Kaupangen Borgund. The Old Norse word kaupang means "marketplace" or "town", thus the market town for Borgund.  The Old Norse form of the current name was Álasund.  The first element of that (probably) is the plural genitive case of áll which means "eel" and the last element is sund which means "strait" or "sound".  Before 1921, the name was written Aalesund.

Climate
Ålesund has a temperate and heavily moderated oceanic climate (Köppen Cfb). The climate is extremely mild for the latitude and inland areas at similar parallels especially in lowland Sweden see much hotter summers and colder winters.

The following climate data is from the local Ålesund Airport, Vigra, which is technically not located in the town, but on a nearby island in the sea in Giske Municipality. Ålesund itself is more sheltered and has slightly warmer summers.

Transportation

Ålesund is a port of call for passenger and freight vessels travelling between Bergen, Kingston upon Hull, Newcastle, Hamburg, and Trondheim, including the Hurtigruta (Norwegian Coastal Express) cruise ships, which arrive in Ålesund twice a day.

The town's airport, Ålesund Airport, Vigra, has several daily flights to/from Oslo, Bergen, Trondheim, and Copenhagen. In November 2012 KLM announced it would fly to Ålesund 5 days a week from Amsterdam starting in April 2013.

Culture

The Norwegian Centre of Art Nouveau Architecture, Jugendstilsenteret, is situated in Ålesund. It is a museum and interpretive center with exhibitions telling the story of the town fire and Art Nouveu/Jugendstil in Norway and Europe.

Sunnmøre museum, founded in 1931, is an outdoor folk museum devoted to the Norwegian coastal culture and way of life.

The local newspaper is Sunnmørsposten, founded in 1882 and published six days a week. Ålesund is the site of the annual Norwegian Food Festival.

Education
Ålesund is home to a sub-division of the Norwegian University of Science and Technology (NTNU), with approximately 1,800 students and 150 employees. The Ålesund School of Art is a school for visual arts located in Ålesund.

Ålesund videregående skole, also known as Latinskolen, formerly Aalesund Lærd- og Realskole, is the oldest secondary school in Ålesund, having been established in 1863. Of the six upper secondary schools in Ålesund, including Latinskolen, Fagerlia videregående skole is the largest with room for approximately 1,000 students.

Ålesund also features an International school for children aged 5–15.

See also
List of towns and cities in Norway

References

External links

 Municipal fact sheet from Statistics Norway 
 Municipality website 
 Jugendstil Centre/Art Nouveau Centre
 Ålesund Hospital  
 

Ålesund
Cities and towns in Norway
Populated places in Møre og Romsdal
1824 establishments in Norway
Art Nouveau architecture in Norway
Port cities and towns in Norway
Populated places established in 1824